The 2013–14 Danish Cup was the 60th season of the Danish Cup competition. It was the third season since its rebranding as the DBU Pokalen (The DBU Cup). The winner of the competition qualified for the play-off round of the 2014–15 UEFA Europa League.

First round
94 teams were drawn into this round. Matches were played on 28 July and 6, 13-15, 20–21 August 2013.

Second round
56 teams were drawn into this round. Matches were played on 27–29 August and 3-4, 10–11 September 2013.

Third round
32 teams were drawn into this round. Matches were played on 24–26 September and 1–2 October 2013.

Fourth round
16 teams were drawn into this round. Matches were played on 29–30 October and 6 November 2013.

Quarter-finals

Semi-finals

First leg

Second leg

Final

References

External links
 

Danish Cup seasons
Danish Cup
Cup